Paul James Barry (born 24 February 1952) is an English-born, Australian-based journalist, newsreader and television presenter, who has won many awards for his investigative reporting. He previously worked for the BBC on numerous programs, before emigrating to Australia.

Biography

Early life
Barry studied philosophy, politics and economics at the University of Oxford.

Early career
Barry started his journalistic career in London as an economics correspondent for the weekly magazine Investors Chronicle. 

In 1978, he joined the BBC as a reporter for The Money Programme, Newsnight, and then Panorama. In 1986, he moved to Australia and started work with the Australian Broadcasting Corporation.

Four Corners
From 1987 to 1994, Barry worked as an investigative reporter for the ABC's flagship current affairs program Four Corners specialising in economic matters, government departmental failures and corporate governance. A series of reports on disgraced businessman Alan Bond (and his company Bond Corporation) brought his work to national prominence in 1993. He also wrote the book The Rise and Fall of Alan Bond and a TV report on the Wittenoom industrial disaster, "Blue Death".

Seven Network programs and Media Watch
In 1995, Barry joined the Seven Network to present a short-lived news program The Times. He was later the presenter of the current affairs program Witness in 1997. He then returned to the ABC to host Media Watch program in 2000. He was effectively sacked from this show by ABC head Jonathan Shier after a controversial interview with ABC chairman Donald McDonald on the subject of government funding for the ABC. However, in August 2010, Barry acted as Media Watch's temporary host for three months while Jonathan Holmes took long-service leave.

Alan Bond, Sydney Morning Herald and 60 Minutes
In 2001, Barry published a book, Going for Broke – How Alan Bond Got Away with It. For the next two years he wrote for The Sydney Morning Herald, winning an additional Walkley Award exposing a tax scam involving prominent barristers in Sydney. He has served as a Walkley Award judge and on a past Walkley advisory board. He also wrote a book Rich Kids, documenting the collapse of One.Tel. In 2004 he moved to the Nine Network to work as an investigative reporter for 60 Minutes. In February 2011, Alan Bond published a rebuttal of an article written by Barry in December 2010 about Bond's investment in Global Diamond Resources Plc.

Warne biography
In 2006, Barry released a biography on Australian cricketer Shane Warne, called Spun Out.  Extracts of the book were published in The Age's Good Weekend magazine, and some of the content was controversial.

Publishing
During October 2009, Barry was the subject of criticism from Australian business identities for his 2009 unauthorised biography of media and gambling mogul James Packer. The book details relations between the younger Packer and his father Kerry, citing anonymous sources as stating the pair had a difficult relationship, and that James was "relieved" by his father's death. Business leaders and friends of the Packers including former Nine Network CEO Eddie McGuire and mining tycoon Andrew Forrest defended James Packer. Upon launching the book, Barry dismissed the criticism, calling the book "fair" and "considered".

Barry has been a contributor to Crikey, an online magazine published by Private Media (in which he has a minority share). He joined Crikey in December 2010, and was given around  worth of new shares of Private Media in June 2012. In August 2011 Barry was appointed as a senior writer at Private Media's The Power Index, "a free website [which] offers daily news, views and features about power and influence in Australia."

Return to Media Watch
On 3 July 2013, Barry returned as the host of Media Watch following the earlier decision of Jonathan Holmes to leave the show.

On 6 August 2021, Barry was injured in a bicycle accident on his way to work, causing him to take some time off Media Watch to recover from his injuries. The ABC sent over Jeremy Fernandez and Janine Perrett to fill in for him on the program while on recovery. Barry subsequently returned to hosting the program on 30 August 2021.

Political views
When conservative broadcaster Andrew Bolt described Barry as "of the Left" upon his re-appointment to the Media Watch program in 2013, Barry said: "I would certainly describe myself as to the left of Andrew Bolt, so on that basis I am left-wing. But in no other basis do I think I’m left-wing. I believe in the free market, I believe in freedom of speech, I believe actually in privatisation, I believe in an awful lot of things that would make me a free-marketeer and, you know, a Liberal." In 2014, Barry told Media Watch he had voted for Liberal Malcolm Turnbull as his local MP in the 2013 Election.

When Turnbull resigned as Prime Minister ahead of a leadership ballot in 2018, Barry's op-ed on Media Watch, called the Liberal challenge to his leadership "madness", and endorsed the analysis of Fairfax's Peter Hartcher that Turnbull's challenger Peter Dutton was "poison" and Kevin Rudd's analysis that Rupert Murdoch's News Corp is a "cancer on Australian democracy". Barry denounced a "cabal of conservative commentators" including Tony Abbott supporters Alan Jones, Ray Hadley, Paul Murray, Peta Credlin, Andrew Bolt and Rowan Dean for criticising Turnbull's leadership.

Awards

Books
 1991: The Rise And Fall of Alan Bond, 
 1994: The Rise And Rise of Kerry Packer, 
 2000: Going For Broke : How Bond Got Away with It, 
 2001: Going For Broke : How Bond Got Away with It (Revised and Updated), 
 2002: Rich Kids : How the Murdochs and Packers Lost $950 Million in One.Tel, 
 Rich Kids : How the Murdochs and Packers Lost $950 Million in One.Tel (Revised and Updated), 
 2006: Spun Out : the Shane Warne Story, 
 2009: Who Wants To Be A Billionaire? : the James Packer Story,
 2013: Breaking news : sex, lies & the Murdoch succession,

References

External links
 Profile at ABC Online
 Speaker profile at ICMI
 Speaker profile at Saxton

1952 births
Living people
Alumni of the University of Oxford
Australian freelance journalists
Australian television presenters
BBC newsreaders and journalists
English emigrants to Australia
60 Minutes (Australian TV program) correspondents
The Sydney Morning Herald people